Spermophora senoculata, the shortbodied cellar spider, is a species of cellar spider in the family Pholcidae. It is found in Near East, and it has been introduced into the USA, southern Europe, China, Korea, and Japan.

References

 Bradley, Richard A. (2012). Common Spiders of North America. University of California Press.
 Breene, R. G., D. Allen Dean, G. B. Edwards, Blain Hebert, Herbert W. Levi, Gail Manning, et al. (2003). Common Names of Arachnids, Fifth Edition, 42.
 Ubick, Darrell (2005). Spiders of North America: An Identification Manual. American Arachnological Society.

External links

 NCBI Taxonomy Browser, Spermophora senoculata

Pholcidae
Spiders described in 1836